Lyubov Ivanovna Sadchikova (22 September 1951 – 22 November 2012) was a Soviet speed skater who won the all-round world championship in 1978. In 1975, she set a world record in 500 m. Next year, she finished sixth in the same event at the 1976 Winter Olympics. 

She won five national titles in 500 m (1975, 1978) and 1000 m (1974, 1976, 1977) and finished second four times, in all-round (1976, 1974, 1977) and 500 m (1973). In 1974 and 1976 she was third in 500 m. She graduated from an Institute of Physical Education in Samara.

Personal bests:
500 m – 40.84 (1978)
1000 m – 1:23.80 (1976)
1500 m – 2:13.76 (1976)
3000 m – 5:02.50 (1976)

References

1951 births
2012 deaths
Olympic speed skaters of the Soviet Union
Speed skaters at the 1976 Winter Olympics
Soviet female speed skaters
Universiade medalists in speed skating
Universiade bronze medalists for the Soviet Union
Competitors at the 1972 Winter Universiade